Piano Concerto No. 6 in D major, Hess 15 is an unfinished piano concerto by German composer Ludwig van Beethoven.

In (estimated) late 1814 and early 1815, Beethoven spent a great deal of time on a project that never reached completion: a piano concerto in D major, which would, if completed, have been the sixth. He made about seventy pages of sketches for the first movement. He even started writing out a full score (MS Artaria 184 in the Staatsbibliothek zu Berlin), which runs almost uninterrupted from the beginning of the movement to the middle of the solo exposition (bar 182), although the scoring becomes patchy as the work proceeds and there are signs of indecision or dissatisfaction on the composer's part. Beethoven abandoned the work, and this partial movement (known as Hess 15) remains one of the most substantial of Beethoven's unrealized conceptions.

A completion of the first movement was reconstructed by British scholar Nicholas Cook in 1987.

References

Further reading
There is also information at RISM Online here: Description of Brief Sketch at the Staatsbibliothek, Condensed Description of all the Existing Sketches for Concerto 6 at the Staatsbibliothek

06
1815 compositions
Beethoven 06